The 2016 Great Clips 200 was the 2nd stock car race of the 2016 NASCAR Camping World Truck Series, and the 8th iteration of the event. The race was held on Saturday, February 27, 2016, in Hampton, Georgia at Atlanta Motor Speedway, a 1.54 mile (2.48 km) permanent tri-oval shaped speedway. The race took the scheduled 130 laps to complete. At race's end, John Hunter Nemechek, driving for his family team, NEMCO Motorsports, held off Camden Hayley in the final 2 laps, and earned his second career NASCAR Camping World Truck Series win, along with his first of the season. To fill out the podium, Timothy Peters, driving for Red Horse Racing, would finish in 3rd, respectively.

Background 

The race was held at Atlanta Motor Speedway, a 1.54-mile entertainment facility in Hampton, Georgia, United States, 20 miles (32 km) south of Atlanta. It has annually hosted NASCAR Cup Series stock car races since its inauguration in 1960.

The venue was bought by Speedway Motorsports in 1990. In 1994, 46 condominiums were built over the northeastern side of the track. In 1997, to standardize the track with Speedway Motorsports' other two intermediate ovals, the entire track was almost completely rebuilt. The project made the track one of the fastest on the NASCAR circuit.

Entry list 

 (R) denotes rookie driver.
 (i) denotes driver who is ineligible for series driver points.

Practice

First practice 
The first practice session was held on Friday, February 26, at 10:00 AM EST, and would last for 55 minutes.

Second practice 
The second practice session was held on Friday, February 26, at 1:30 PM EST, and would last for 55 minutes.

Final practice 
The final practice session was held on Friday, February 26, at 4:00 PM EST, and would last for 85 minutes.

Qualifying 
Qualifying was held on Saturday, February 27, at 10:00 AM EST. Since Atlanta Motor Speedway is at least 2.0 miles (3.2 km), the qualifying system was a single car, single lap, two round system where in the first round, everyone would set a time to determine positions 13–32. Then, the fastest 12 qualifiers would move on to the second round to determine positions 1–12.

Five drivers would fail to qualify: Jordan Anderson, Korbin Forrister, Norm Benning, Tim Viens, and Ryan Ellis.

Full qualifying results

Race

Race recap 
Matt Crafton and John Wes Townley would lead the field to the green flag. On the initial restart, Townley would spin his tires, resulting him losing several positions. Christopher Bell advanced to the second spot, and eventually took the lead from Crafton on lap 7. After leading 20 laps, Bell's right front tire would go down, giving the lead back to Crafton. He would maintain the lead, until the first caution clock expired on lap 38. On the second restart, Johnny Sauter's truck would lose power, and was forced to make an unscheduled pit stop. He drove past his pit stall and entered the track again, thinking that his truck would get up to speed again, which was unsuccessful. He went to the garage to replace the ignition box, and eventually returned to the race several laps later. The second caution came out at lap 60, after William Byron suffered a blown engine. Tyler Reddick made an unscheduled pit stop during the third restart, after reporting a vibration. Red Horse Racing teammates, Timothy Peters and Ben Kennedy, also had unscheduled pit stops, as Peters suffered a vibration, and Kennedy's shifter would pop out of place. Crafton would continue to lead, until Bell made his way back to front, and retook the lead with around 40 laps to go. The second caution clock would expire with 25 laps to go. John Hunter Nemechek and Crafton lead the field back to green flag. Spencer Gallagher would spin his tires, causing the outside lane to have a slow restart. As a result, Daniel Suárez would move into second, and immediately went to the outside lane to try and pass Crafton for the lead. The two were side by side coming into turn two. As they were exiting turn one, Bell would accidentally turn Suárez sideways, causing him to hit the side of Crafton's truck. They would spin in front of the field, with Crafton and Suárez receiving numerous damage. Surprisingly, everyone would make it through the wreck. The race would go under red flag to assess all the damage.

Final laps 
The field would restart with 15 laps to go, with Nemechek and Cameron Hayley leading the field. Bell would quickly take the lead back a lap later. He would suddenly blow a tire with 8 laps to go, causing him to hit the outside wall hard. Nemechek and Townley would lead the field on the final restart with 2 laps to go. Townley would spin his tires once again, causing Cameron Hayley to advance into the second spot. Nemechek held off Hayley in the final 2 laps, and would earn his second career NASCAR Camping World Truck Series win. Hayley, Peters, Hemric, and Enfinger would round out the top 5.

Race results

Standings after the race 

Drivers' Championship standings

Note: Only the first 8 positions are included for the driver standings.

References 

NASCAR races at Atlanta Motor Speedway
February 2016 sports events in the United States
2016 in sports in Georgia (U.S. state)